Wildcat Bus is a 1940 American action film directed by Frank Woodruff and written by Lou Lusty. The film stars Fay Wray, Charles Lang, Paul Guilfoyle, Don Costello and Paul McGrath. The film was released on August 23, 1940, by RKO Pictures.

Plot

Cast 
Fay Wray as Ted Dawson
Charles Lang as Jerry Waters
Paul Guilfoyle as Donovan
Don Costello as Sid Casey
Paul McGrath as Stanley Regan
Joe Sawyer as Burke 
Roland Drew as Davis
Leona Roberts as Emma 'Ma' Talbot
Oscar O'Shea as Charles Dawson
Frank Shannon as Sweeney
Warren Ashe as Joe Miller

References

External links 
 

1940 films
American black-and-white films
Films scored by Roy Webb
RKO Pictures films
Films produced by Cliff Reid
American action films
1940s action films
1940s English-language films
Films directed by Frank Woodruff
1940s American films